Samuel Ireri Gathimba (born 26 October 1987) is a Kenyan racewalking athlete. He was the 20 kilometres walk gold medallist at the African Championships in Athletics in 2016. He holds a personal best of 1:19:24 hours.

Gathimba emerged at international level in 2014, taking a silver medal at the 2014 African Championships in Athletics behind Lebogang Shange of South Africa. He set a personal best of 1:23:59 hours to place second at the national championships that year, behind David Kimutai Rotich. He topped the podium at the 2015 national trials with a new best of 1:23:12 hours, which ranked him in the world's top 100 for the first time. He again demonstrated his place among the continent's best at the 2015 African Games where he lost out on the gold to Shange by a margin of one second.

The 2016 season proved to be a breakthrough for Gathimba. At the 2016 African Championships in Athletics he was a gold medallist by a large margin, crossing the line in a championship record of 1:19:24 hours. This was a Kenyan record and was 22 seconds off Hatem Ghoula's near two-decade-old African best.

He has qualified to represent Kenya at the 2020 Summer Olympics.

International competitions

National titles
Kenyan Athletics Championships
20 km walk: 2015

References

External links



Living people
1987 births
Kenyan male racewalkers
Athletes (track and field) at the 2016 Summer Olympics
Athletes (track and field) at the 2018 Commonwealth Games
Olympic athletes of Kenya
African Games silver medalists for Kenya
African Games medalists in athletics (track and field)
Commonwealth Games medallists in athletics
Commonwealth Games bronze medallists for Kenya
Athletes (track and field) at the 2015 African Games
Athletes (track and field) at the 2019 African Games
African Games gold medalists for Kenya
African Championships in Athletics winners
African Games gold medalists in athletics (track and field)
Medallists at the 2018 Commonwealth Games